More Joyous (foaled 20 August 2006) is an Australian trained and New Zealand bred Thoroughbred racemare, trained by Gai Waterhouse, who has won eight Group 1 races.

Pedigree
More Joyous is by the leading Southern Halo sire More Than Ready, and from the Australian Oaks winning Sunday Silence mare Sunday Joy.

Racing career
More Joyous made her debut in January 2009 by winning a two-year -ld fillies handicap by five and a half lengths. A month later she was sent out a $1.35 favourite in the Group 2 Silver Slipper Stakes at Rosehill. When the barriers opened the saddle on More Joyous slipped and she began buckjumping for about 100 metres and took no part in the race. Three weeks later she took out the Group 2 Reisling Stakes by 2.3 lengths from Melito before finishing second last in the Golden Slipper Stakes which was won by Phelan Ready. Following the race, Jockey Darren Beadman was suspended for five meetings for careless riding on More Joyous.

More Joyous began her spring campaign as a three-year-old by finishing third to Madam Pedrille in the 1100 metre listed Sheraco Stakes before winning the Group 2 Tea Rose Stakes and the Group 1 Flight Stakes. She was then spelled for four months and returned in the summer with a win in the Light Fingers Stakes, followed by a win in Surround Stakes.

Resuming as a spring four-year-old, More Joyous won the first four starts of her campaign, including Group One wins in the George Main Stakes and Toorak Handicap. She then stepped up in distance in the Cox Plate, where she started second favorite behind dominant favorite So You Think. She took on So You Think in the lead in the Cox Plate, before fading to fifth place behind him. Resuming again in the autumn, she again won her first four starts of her campaign, including the Futurity Stakes and Queen of the Turf Stakes at Group One level, before failing in the Doncaster Handicap on a heavy track.

Racing record

References 

2006 racehorse births
Racehorses bred in New Zealand
Racehorses trained in Australia
Thoroughbred family 16-c